Strâmbu may refer to several places in Romania:

 Strâmbu, a village in Chiuiești Commune, Cluj County
 Strâmbu, a tributary of the Șușița in Gorj County
 Strâmbu, a tributary of the Valea de Pești in Gorj County
 Strâmbu (Sălătruc), a tributary of the Sălătruc in Cluj County
 Strâmbu, a tributary of the Buzău in Brașov County
 Strâmbul Băiuț, a tributary of the Lăpuș in Maramureș County

See also 
 Strâmba (disambiguation)
 Strâmbeni (disambiguation)